In chemistry, pH, also referred to as acidity, historically denoting "potential of hydrogen" (or "power of hydrogen"), is a scale used to specify the acidity or basicity of an aqueous solution. Acidic solutions (solutions with higher concentrations of  ions) are measured to have lower pH values than basic or alkaline solutions.

The pH scale is logarithmic and inversely indicates the activity of hydrogen ions in the solution.

where [H+] is the equilibrium molar concentration (mol dm−3) of H+ in the solution. At 25 °C (77°F), solutions with a pH less than 7 are acidic, and solutions with a pH greater than 7 are basic. Solutions with a pH of 7 at this temperature are neutral (i.e. have the same concentration of H+ ions as OH− ions, i.e. the same as pure water). The neutral value of the pH depends on the temperaturebeing lower than 7 if the temperature increases above 25 °C. The pH value can be less than 0 for very concentrated strong acids, or greater than 14 for very concentrated strong bases.

The pH scale is traceable to a set of standard solutions whose pH is established by international agreement. Primary pH standard values are determined using a concentration cell with transference, by measuring the potential difference between a hydrogen electrode and a standard electrode such as the silver chloride electrode. The pH of aqueous solutions can be measured with a glass electrode and a pH meter, or a color-changing indicator. Measurements of pH are important in chemistry, agronomy, medicine, water treatment, and many other applications.

History
The concept of pH was first introduced by the Danish chemist Søren Peter Lauritz Sørensen at the Carlsberg Laboratory in 1909 and was revised to the modern pH in 1924 to accommodate definitions and measurements in terms of electrochemical cells. In the first papers, the notation had H• as a subscript to the lowercase p, thus: pH•.
For the sign p, I propose the name 'hydrogen ion exponent' and the symbol pH•. Then, for the hydrogen ion exponent (pH•) of a solution, the negative value of the Briggsian logarithm of the related hydrogen ion normality factor is to be understood.

The exact meaning of the letter p in "pH" is disputed, as Sørensen did not explain why he used it. Sørensen describes a way of measuring pH using potential differences, and it represents the negative power of 10 in the concentration of hydrogen ions. The letter p could stand for the French puissance, German Potenz, or Danish potens, meaning "power", or it could mean "potential". All the words for these start with the letter p in French, German, and Danish—all languages Sørensen published in: Carlsberg Laboratory was French-speaking, German was the dominant language of scientific publishing, and Sørensen was Danish. He also used the letter q in much the same way elsewhere in the paper. He might also have labelled the test solution "p" and the reference solution "q" arbitrarily; these letters are often paired. Some literature sources state that the "pH" stands for the Latin term pondus hydrogenii (quantity of hydrogen) or potentia hydrogenii (power of hydrogen), although this is not supported by Sørensen's writings.

Currently in chemistry, the p stands for "the negative decimal logarithm of", and is also used in the term pKa, used for acid dissociation constants and pOH, the equivalent for hydroxide ions.

Bacteriologist Alice C. Evans, famed for her work's influence on dairying and food safety, credited William Mansfield Clark and colleagues (of whom she was one) with developing pH measuring methods in the 1910s, which had a wide influence on laboratory and industrial use thereafter. In her memoir, she does not mention how much, or how little, Clark and colleagues knew about Sørensen's work a few years prior. She said: 
In these studies [of bacterial metabolism] Dr. Clark's attention was directed to the effect of acid on the growth of bacteria. He found that it is the intensity of the acid in terms of hydrogen-ion concentration that affects their growth. But existing methods of measuring acidity determined the quantity, not the intensity, of the acid. Next, with his collaborators, Dr. Clark developed accurate methods for measuring hydrogen-ion concentration. These methods replaced the inaccurate titration method of determining the acid content in use in biologic laboratories throughout the world. Also they were found to be applicable in many industrial and other processes in which they came into wide usage.

The first electronic method for measuring pH was invented by Arnold Orville Beckman, a professor at California Institute of Technology in 1934. It was in response to local citrus grower Sunkist that wanted a better method for quickly testing the pH of lemons they were picking from their nearby orchards.

Definition and measurement

pH
pH is defined as the decimal logarithm of the reciprocal of the hydrogen ion activity, aH+, in a solution.

For example, for a solution with a hydrogen ion activity of 5×10−6 (at that level, this is essentially the number of moles of hydrogen ions per litre of solution) the argument of the logarithm is 1/(5×10−6) = 2×105; thus such a solution has a pH of log10(2×105) = 5.3. Consider the following example: a quantity of 107 moles of pure  water at 25 °C (pH = 7), or 180 metric tonnes (18×107 g), contains close to 18 milligrams of dissociated hydrogen ions.

Note that pH depends on temperature. For instance at 0 °C the pH of pure water is about 7.47. At 25 °C it is 7.00, and at 100 °C it is 6.14.

This definition was adopted because ion-selective electrodes, which are used to measure pH, respond to activity. Ideally, the electrode potential, E, follows the Nernst equation, which for the hydrogen ion can be written as

where E is a measured potential, E0 is the standard electrode potential, R is the gas constant, T is the temperature in kelvins, F is the Faraday constant. For  the number of electrons transferred is one. It follows that the electrode potential is proportional to pH when pH is defined in terms of activity. Precise measurement of pH is presented in International Standard ISO 31-8 as follows: A galvanic cell is set up to measure the electromotive force (e.m.f.) between a reference electrode and an electrode sensitive to the hydrogen ion activity when they are both immersed in the same aqueous solution. The reference electrode may be a silver chloride electrode or a calomel electrode. The hydrogen-ion selective electrode is a standard hydrogen electrode.

Reference electrode | concentrated solution of KCl || test solution | H2 | Pt

Firstly, the cell is filled with a solution of known hydrogen ion activity and the electromotive force, ES, is measured. Then the electromotive force, EX, of the same cell containing the solution of unknown pH is measured.

The difference between the two measured electromotive force values is proportional to pH. This method of calibration avoids the need to know the standard electrode potential.

To apply this process in practice, a glass electrode is used rather than the cumbersome hydrogen electrode. A combined glass electrode has an in-built reference electrode. It is calibrated against buffer solutions of known hydrogen ion activity. IUPAC (International Union of Pure and Applied Chemistry) has proposed the use of a set of buffer solutions of known  activity. Two or more buffer solutions are used in order to accommodate the fact that the "slope" may differ slightly from ideal. To implement this approach to calibration, the electrode is first immersed in a standard solution and the reading on a pH meter is adjusted to be equal to the standard buffer's value. The reading from a second standard buffer solution is then adjusted, using the "slope" control, to be equal to the pH for that solution. Further details, are given in the IUPAC recommendations. When more than two buffer solutions are used the electrode is calibrated by fitting observed pH values to a straight line with respect to standard buffer values. Commercial standard buffer solutions usually come with information on the value at 25 °C and a correction factor to be applied for other temperatures.

The pH scale is logarithmic and therefore pH is a dimensionless quantity.

P[H]
This was the original definition of Sørensen in 1909, which was superseded in favor of pH in 1924. [H] is the concentration of hydrogen ions, denoted [] in modern chemistry, which appears to have units of concentration.

However, it is possible to measure the concentration of hydrogen ions directly, if the electrode is calibrated in terms of hydrogen ion concentrations. One way to do this, which has been used extensively, is to titrate a solution of known concentration of a strong acid with a solution of known concentration of strong alkaline in the presence of a relatively high concentration of background electrolyte. Since the concentrations of acid and alkaline are known, it is easy to calculate the concentration of hydrogen ions so that the measured potential can be correlated with concentrations. The calibration is usually carried out using a Gran plot. Thus, the effect of using this procedure is to make activity equal to the numerical value of concentration.

The glass electrode (and other ion selective electrodes) should be calibrated in a medium similar to the one being investigated. For instance, if one wishes to measure the pH of a seawater sample, the electrode should be calibrated in a solution resembling seawater in its chemical composition, as detailed below.

The difference between p[H] and pH is quite small. It has been stated that pH = p[H] + 0.04. It is common practice to use the term "pH" for both types of measurement.

pH indicators

Indicators may be used to measure pH, by making use of the fact that their color changes with pH. Visual comparison of the color of a test solution with a standard color chart provides a means to measure pH accurate to the nearest whole number. More precise measurements are possible if the color is measured spectrophotometrically, using a colorimeter or spectrophotometer.
Universal indicator consists of a mixture of indicators such that there is a continuous color change from about pH 2 to pH 10. Universal indicator paper is made from absorbent paper that has been impregnated with universal indicator. Another method of measuring pH is using an electronic pH meter.

pOH

pOH is sometimes used as a measure of the concentration of hydroxide ions, . pOH values are derived from pH measurements. The concentration of hydroxide ions in water is related to the concentration of hydrogen ions by

where KW is the self-ionization constant of water. Taking logarithms

So, at room temperature, pOH ≈ 14 − pH. However this relationship is not strictly valid in other circumstances, such as in measurements of soil alkalinity.

Extremes of pH
Measurement of pH below about 2.5 (ca. 0.003 mol/dm3 acid) and above about 10.5 (ca. 0.0003 mol/dm3 alkaline) requires special procedures because, when using the glass electrode, the Nernst law breaks down under those conditions. Various factors contribute to this. It cannot be assumed that liquid junction potentials are independent of pH. Also, extreme pH implies that the solution is concentrated, so electrode potentials are affected by ionic strength variation. Specially constructed electrodes are available which partly overcome these problems.

Runoff from mines or mine tailings can produce some very low pH values.

Non-aqueous solutions
Hydrogen ion concentrations (activities) can be measured in non-aqueous solvents. pH values based on these measurements belong to a different scale from aqueous pH values, because activities relate to different standard states. Hydrogen ion activity, aH+, can be defined as:

where μH+ is the chemical potential of the hydrogen ion,  is its chemical potential in the chosen standard state, R is the gas constant and T is the thermodynamic temperature. Therefore, pH values on the different scales cannot be compared directly due to different solvated proton ions such as lyonium ions, requiring an intersolvent scale which involves the transfer activity coefficient of hydronium/lyonium ion.

pH is an example of an acidity function. Other acidity functions can be defined. For example, the Hammett acidity function, H0, has been developed in connection with superacids.

Unified absolute pH scale
In 2010, a new "unified absolute pH scale" has been proposed that would allow various pH ranges across different solutions to use a common proton reference standard. It has been developed on the basis of the absolute chemical potential of the proton. This model uses the Lewis acid–base definition. This scale applies to liquids, gases and even solids.

Applications

Pure water is neutral. When an acid is dissolved in water, the pH will be less than 7 (25 °C). When a base, or specifically an alkali, is dissolved in water, the pH will be greater than 7. A solution of a strong acid, such as hydrochloric acid, at concentration 1 mol dm−3 has a pH of 0. A solution of a strong alkali, such as sodium hydroxide, at concentration 1 mol dm−3, has a pH of 14. Thus, measured pH values will lie mostly in the range 0 to 14, though negative pH values and values above 14 are entirely possible. Since pH is a logarithmic scale, a difference of one pH unit is equivalent to a tenfold difference in hydrogen ion concentration.

The pH of neutrality is not exactly 7 (25 °C), although this is a good approximation in most cases. Neutrality is defined as the condition where [] = [] (or the activities are equal). Since self-ionization of water holds the product of these concentration []/M×[]/M = Kw, it can be seen that at neutrality []/M = []/M = , or pH = pKw/2. pKw is approximately 14 but depends on ionic strength and temperature, and so the pH of neutrality does also. Pure water and a solution of NaCl in pure water are both neutral, since dissociation of water produces equal numbers of both ions. However the pH of the neutral NaCl solution will be slightly different from that of neutral pure water because the hydrogen and hydroxide ions' activity is dependent on ionic strength, so Kw varies with ionic strength.

If pure water is exposed to air it becomes mildly acidic. This is because water absorbs carbon dioxide from the air, which is then slowly converted into bicarbonate and hydrogen ions (essentially creating carbonic acid).

pH in soil

Classification of soil pH ranges

The United States Department of Agriculture Natural Resources Conservation Service, formerly Soil Conservation Service classifies soil pH ranges as follows:

In Europe, topsoil pH is influenced by soil parent material, erosional effects, climate and vegetation. A recent map of topsoil pH in Europe shows the alkaline soils in Mediterranean, Hungary, East Romania, North France. Scandinavian countries, Portugal, Poland and North Germany have more acid soils.

Measuring soil pH 
Soil in the field is a heterogeneous colloidal system that comprises sand, silt, clays, microorganisms, plant roots, and myriad other living cells and decaying organic material. Soil pH is a master variable that affects myriad processes and properties of interest to soil and environmental scientists, farmers, and engineers. To quantify the concentration of the H+ in such a complex system, soil samples from a given soil horizon are brought to the laboratory where they are homogenized, sieved, and sometimes dried prior to analysis. A mass of soil (for example, 5 g field-moist to best represent field conditions) is mixed into a slurry with distilled water or 0.01 M CaCl2 (for example, 10 mL). After mixing well, the suspension is stirred vigorously and allowed to stand for 15–20 minutes, during which time, the sand and silt particles settle out and the clays and other colloids remain suspended in the overlying water, known as the aqueous phase. A pH electrode connected to a pH meter is calibrated with buffered solutions of known pH (for example, pH 4 and 7) before being inserting into the upper portion of the aqueous phase, and the pH is measured. A combination pH electrode incorporates both the H+ sensing electrode (glass electrode) and a reference electrode that provides a pH-insensitive reference voltage and a salt bridge to the hydrogen electrode. In other configurations, the glass and reference electrodes are separate and attach to the pH meter in two ports. The pH meter measures the potential (voltage) difference between the two electrodes and converts it to pH. The separate reference electrode is usually the calomel electrode, the silver-silver chloride electrode is used in the combination electrode.

There are numerous uncertainties in operationally defining soil pH in the above way. Since an electrical potential difference between the glass and reference electrodes is what is measured, the activity of H+ is really being quantified, rather than concentration. The H+ activity is sometimes called the "effective H+ concentration" and is directly related to the chemical potential of the proton and its ability to do chemical and electrical work in the soil solution in equilibrium with the solid phases. Clay and organic matter particles carry negative charge on their surfaces, and H+ ions attracted to them are in equilibrium with H+ ions in the soil solution. The measured pH is quantified in the aqueous phase only, by definition, but the value obtained is affected by the presence and nature of the soil colloids and the ionic strength of the aqueous phase. Changing the water-to-soil ratio in the slurry can change the pH by disturbing the water-colloid equilibrium, particularly the ionic strength. The use of 0.01 M CaCl2 instead of water obviates this effect of water-to-soil ratio and gives a more consistent approximation of "soil pH" that relates to plant root growth, rhizosphere and microbial activity, drainage water acidity, and chemical processes in the soil. Using 0.01 M CaCl2 brings all of the soluble ions in the aqueous phase closer to the colloidal surfaces, and allows the H+ activity to be measured closer to them. Using the 0.01 M CaCl2 solution thereby allows a more consistent, quantitative estimation of H+ activity, especially if diverse soil samples are being compared in space and time.

pH in nature

pH-dependent plant pigments that can be used as pH indicators occur in many plants, including hibiscus, red cabbage (anthocyanin), and grapes (red wine). The juice of citrus fruits is acidic mainly because it contains citric acid. Other carboxylic acids occur in many living systems. For example, lactic acid is produced by muscle activity. The state of protonation of phosphate derivatives, such as ATP, is pH-dependent. The functioning of the oxygen-transport enzyme hemoglobin is affected by pH in a process known as the Root effect.

Seawater

The pH of seawater is typically limited to a range between 7.4 and 8.5. It plays an important role in the ocean's carbon cycle, and there is evidence of ongoing ocean acidification caused by carbon dioxide emissions. However, pH measurement is complicated by the chemical properties of seawater, and several distinct pH scales exist in chemical oceanography.

As part of its operational definition of the pH scale, the IUPAC defines a series of buffer solutions across a range of pH values (often denoted with National Bureau of Standards (NBS) or National Institute of Standards and Technology (NIST) designation). These solutions have a relatively low ionic strength (≈0.1) compared to that of seawater (≈0.7), and, as a consequence, are not recommended for use in characterizing the pH of seawater, since the ionic strength differences cause changes in electrode potential. To resolve this problem, an alternative series of buffers based on artificial seawater was developed. This new series resolves the problem of ionic strength differences between samples and the buffers, and the new pH scale is referred to as the 'total scale', often denoted as pHT. The total scale was defined using a medium containing sulfate ions. These ions experience protonation,  + , such that the total scale includes the effect of both protons (free hydrogen ions) and hydrogen sulfate ions:

[]T = []F + []

An alternative scale, the 'free scale', often denoted 'pHF', omits this consideration and focuses solely on []F, in principle making it a simpler representation of hydrogen ion concentration.

[]F = []T − [] = []T ( 1 + [] / K )−1

However, it is difficult to estimate K in seawater, limiting the utility of the otherwise more straightforward free scale.

Another scale, known as the 'seawater scale', often denoted 'pHSWS', takes account of a further protonation relationship between hydrogen ions and fluoride ions,  +  ⇌ HF. Resulting in the following expression for []SWS:

[]SWS = []F + [] + [HF]

However, the advantage of considering this additional complexity is dependent upon the abundance of fluoride in the medium. In seawater, for instance, sulfate ions occur at much greater concentrations (>400 times) than those of fluoride. As a consequence, for most practical purposes, the difference between the total and seawater scales is very small.

The following three equations summarise the three scales of pH:

pHF = −log []F
pHT = −log([]F + []) = −log[]T
pHSWS = −log(]F + [] + [HF]) = −log[v]SWS

In practical terms, the three seawater pH scales differ in their values by up to 0.10 pH units, differences that are much larger than the accuracy of pH measurements typically required, in particular, in relation to the ocean's carbonate system. Since it omits consideration of sulfate and fluoride ions, the free scale is significantly different from both the total and seawater scales. Because of the relative unimportance of the fluoride ion, the total and seawater scales differ only very slightly.

Living systems
{| class="wikitable"
|+pH in living systems
|-
! Compartment
! pH
|-
| Gastric acid || 1.5–3.5
|-
| Lysosomes || 4.5
|-
| Human skin || 4.7
|-
| Granules of chromaffin cells || 5.5
|-
| Urine || 6.0
|-
| Cytosol || 7.2
|-
| Blood (natural pH) || 7.34–7.45
|-
| Cerebrospinal fluid (CSF) || 7.5
|-
| Mitochondrial matrix || 7.5
|-
| Pancreas secretions || 8.1
|}

The pH of different cellular compartments, body fluids, and organs is usually tightly regulated in a process called acid–base homeostasis. The most common disorder in acid–base homeostasis is acidosis, which means an acid overload in the body, generally defined by pH falling below 7.35. Alkalosis is the opposite condition, with blood pH being excessively high.

The pH of blood is usually slightly basic with a value of pH 7.365. This value is often referred to as physiological pH in biology and medicine. Plaque can create a local acidic environment that can result in tooth decay by demineralization. Enzymes and other proteins have an optimum pH range and can become inactivated or denatured outside this range.

Calculations of pH
The calculation of the pH of a solution containing acids and/or bases is an example of a chemical speciation calculation, that is, a mathematical procedure for calculating the concentrations of all chemical species that are present in the solution. The complexity of the procedure depends on the nature of the solution. For strong acids and bases no calculations are necessary except in extreme situations. The pH of a solution containing a weak acid requires the solution of a quadratic equation. The pH of a solution containing a weak base may require the solution of a cubic equation. The general case requires the solution of a set of non-linear simultaneous equations.

A complicating factor is that water itself is a weak acid and a weak base (see amphoterism). It dissociates according to the equilibrium

with a dissociation constant,  defined as

where [H+] stands for the concentration of the aqueous hydronium ion and [OH−] represents the concentration of the hydroxide ion. This equilibrium needs to be taken into account at high pH and when the solute concentration is extremely low.

Strong acids and bases
Strong acids and bases are compounds that for practical purposes, are completely dissociated in water. Under normal circumstances this means that the concentration of hydrogen ions in acidic solution can be taken to be equal to the concentration of the acid. The pH is then equal to minus the logarithm of the concentration value. Hydrochloric acid (HCl) is an example of a strong acid. The pH of a 0.01M solution of HCl is equal to −log10(0.01), that is, pH = 2. Sodium hydroxide, NaOH, is an example of a strong base. The p[OH] value of a 0.01M solution of NaOH is equal to −log10(0.01), that is, p[OH] = 2. From the definition of p[OH] in the pOH section above, this means that the pH is equal to about 12. For solutions of sodium hydroxide at higher concentrations the self-ionization equilibrium must be taken into account.

Self-ionization must also be considered when concentrations are extremely low. Consider, for example, a solution of hydrochloric acid at a concentration of 5×10−8M. The simple procedure given above would suggest that it has a pH of 7.3. This is clearly wrong as an acid solution should have a pH of less than 7. Treating the system as a mixture of hydrochloric acid and the amphoteric substance water, a pH of 6.89 results.

Weak acids and bases

A weak acid or the conjugate acid of a weak base can be treated using the same formalism.
 Acid HA: 
 Base A: 

First, an acid dissociation constant is defined as follows. Electrical charges are omitted from subsequent equations for the sake of generality

and its value is assumed to have been determined by experiment. This being so, there are three unknown concentrations, [HA], [H+] and [A−] to determine by calculation. Two additional equations are needed. One way to provide them is to apply the law of mass conservation in terms of the two "reagents" H and A.

C stands for analytical concentration. In some texts, one mass balance equation is replaced by an equation of charge balance. This is satisfactory for simple cases like this one, but is more difficult to apply to more complicated cases as those below. Together with the equation defining Ka, there are now three equations in three unknowns. When an acid is dissolved in water CA = CH = Ca, the concentration of the acid, so [A] = [H]. After some further algebraic manipulation an equation in the hydrogen ion concentration may be obtained.

Solution of this quadratic equation gives the hydrogen ion concentration and hence p[H] or, more loosely, pH. This procedure is illustrated in an ICE table which can also be used to calculate the pH when some additional (strong) acid or alkaline has been added to the system, that is, when CA ≠ CH.

For example, what is the pH of a 0.01M solution of benzoic acid, pKa = 4.19?

 Step 1: 
 Step 2: Set up the quadratic equation. 
 Step 3: Solve the quadratic equation. 
For alkaline solutions an additional term is added to the mass-balance equation for hydrogen. Since addition of hydroxide reduces the hydrogen ion concentration, and the hydroxide ion concentration is constrained by the self-ionization equilibrium to be equal to 

In this case the resulting equation in [H] is a cubic equation.

General method
Some systems, such as with polyprotic acids, are amenable to spreadsheet calculations. With three or more reagents or when many complexes are formed with general formulae such as ApBqHr,the following general method can be used to calculate the pH of a solution. For example, with three reagents, each equilibrium is characterized by an equilibrium constant, β.

Next, write down the mass-balance equations for each reagent:

Note that there are no approximations involved in these equations, except that each stability constant is defined as a quotient of concentrations, not activities. Much more complicated expressions are required if activities are to be used.

There are 3 non-linear simultaneous equations in the three unknowns, [A], [B] and [H]. Because the equations are non-linear, and because concentrations may range over many powers of 10, the solution of these equations is not straightforward. However, many computer programs are available which can be used to perform these calculations. There may be more than three reagents. The calculation of hydrogen ion concentrations, using this formalism, is a key element in the determination of equilibrium constants by potentiometric titration.

See also 
 pH indicator
 Arterial blood gas
 Chemical equilibrium
 p
 pKa

References

External links

Acid–base chemistry
Equilibrium chemistry
Units of measurement
Water quality indicators
Logarithmic scales of measurement
General chemistry